CKY is an American rock band from West Chester, Pennsylvania. Formed in 1998 by Deron Miller, Chad I Ginsburg and Jess Margera, the group released its first two albums Volume 1 and Volume 2 (a compilation of songs and skits from the first CKY video) on Teil Martin/Distant Recordings in 1999, supported by lead single "96 Quite Bitter Beings". After signing with Island/Def Jam, the band followed their debuts up in 2002 with Infiltrate•Destroy•Rebuild, which was their first release to chart when it reached number 99 on the US Billboard 200 and number 108 on the UK Albums Chart. Lead single "Familiar Realm" reached the US Mainstream Rock top 40. In 2005, CKY issued An Answer Can Be Found and reached number 35 of the Billboard 200, with "Familiar Realm" peaking at number 32 on the Mainstream Rock chart.

With Matt Deis added as its first full-time bassist, CKY signed with Roadrunner Records in 2006 and released Carver City in 2009. The album reached number 46 on the US Billboard 200, number 4 on the Top Hard Rock Albums chart, and number 14 on the Top Rock Albums chart. In March 2011, the group released its first career-retrospective album B-Sides & Rarities, followed by B-Sides & Rarities Volume II later in the year. After continued tensions between band members, frontman Deron Miller left CKY in 2011; he was replaced by Daniel Davies for a number of shows in 2012 and later in 2015, before the group went on an extended hiatus.

CKY returned in 2016 with Ginsburg taking over lead vocals, signing with Entertainment One Music and releasing The Phoenix in 2017. The album was the band's first since its debut not to chart on the Billboard 200, although it did reach the top 20 of the Independent Albums chart. The limited edition EP Too Precious to Kill was released in 2018 to support Record Store Day, featuring four new tracks. In 2020, the group released a livestreamed show dubbed fuCKYou 2020 on vinyl.

Albums

Studio albums

Live albums

Compilations

Extended plays

Singles

Videos

Video albums

Music videos

References

External links
CKY discography at AllMusic

Discography
CKY
CKY
CKY